Charles P. Graham, born in Utica, New York on June 6, 1839, was the twenty ninth Adjutant General of the State of Connecticut. Graham was one of the original dental commissioners of the state being first appointed in 1893. In 1896 he served as president of the State Dental Society. Graham was a prominent member of the Universalist Church. He practiced dentistry for 36 years.

Military career
In December 8, 1871 Graham joined the Middletown company, H, of the Second Regiment, as a private. A month later he was first sergeant. Graham was elected first lieutenant and eight months later on April 21, 1873 became captain. On September 3, 1875 he was appointed to second regiment and then on July 5, 1878 succeeded Stephen R. Smith a colonel. On January 28, 1885 he became brigadier-general.  In 1895 Charles P. Graham became Connecticut Adjutant General until 1896

Personal life
Charles P. Graham was the son of George W. Graham. He moved the Middletown, Connecticut in 1857. Graham got married and a daughter who was killed in the Park Central disaster in Hartford. On November 2, 1904 General Charles P. Graham killed himself. He was survived by his wife; a daughter, Mrs. Eugene P. Pelton of Essex. He had a brother, George T. Graham of Hartford, and three sisters, Mrs. Edwin A. Sawyer of Hartford, Mrs. A.O. Carter of Niantic and Mrs. Charles Barlett of New Haven.

References

Military personnel from Connecticut
Connecticut Adjutant Generals
1839 births
1904 deaths
1904 suicides
Suicides by firearm in Connecticut